The Battle of the Bluegrass is the name given to the Eastern Kentucky–Western Kentucky football rivalry. Both schools were formerly members of the Ohio Valley Conference, and played against each other regularly until Western Kentucky's transition from the NCAA's FCS to FBS in 2008. The two teams have met 84 times on the football field, with Western Kentucky currently holding a 47–35–3 edge in the all-time series. The series resumed again in 2017, when Western Kentucky hosted Eastern Kentucky in a game played at Houchens Industries–L. T. Smith Stadium. The two teams will meet again on September 7, 2024.

Game results

See also  
 List of NCAA college football rivalry games

References

College football rivalries in the United States
Eastern Kentucky Colonels football
Western Kentucky Hilltoppers football
1914 establishments in Kentucky
Recurring sporting events established in 1914